The Kesselberg near Edenkoben in the German state of Rhineland-Palatinate (Südliche Weinstraße county) is a mountain, It is second highest peak in the Palatine Forest region after the Kalmit (672.6 m) and also the third highest mountain in the Palatinate region (highest: Donnersberg 686.5 m).

Location 
The Kesselberg is located, like the Kalmit, in the mountain range of Haardt between the Edenkobener valley in the north and the Modenbach valley in the south. From the Rhine Plain the mountain is hidden behind the Blättersberg (618 m). Views over the surrounding regions in the Palatine Forest are blocked by the trees that cover the summit.

Gletschermulden 
On the summit plateau are various rocks, named on hiking maps as the Gletschermulden, with striking round depressions in the Bunter sandstone of which they are composed. In addition to an unprovable theory that they were originally Celtic sacrifice bowls, there is also a theory that they are glacial potholes or mills. However, they would require a thick ice sheet to have covered the region and there is no  evidence, such as glacial stria, anywhere in the Palatine region. It is thus questionable whether this could have been a periglacial site in the last ice age, as has been posited. A new interpretation suggests the depressions were simply formed by weathering processes in the various layers of sandstone.

The old signpost on the Kesselberg has been replaced by a new one. It discusses the formation of the depressions in both an amusing, but also a scientific, way.

Access
The summit may be climbed from the trail forks at Benderplatz and Kohlplatz. From the main trail that links both junctions, a smaller footpath branches off, leading to the summit. This footpath was blazed in 1953 by the historian, Friedrich Sprater, and named after him. The Benderplatz may be reached from the Lolosruhe car park and the Forsthaus Heldenstein (a former forester's lodge), the Kohlplatz from the Modenbach valley and the Edenkobener valley near the Edenkobener Hut.

Gallery

References

External links 

Mountains and hills of Rhineland-Palatinate
Mountains and hills of the Palatinate Forest
Mountains under 1000 metres
Südliche Weinstraße